Quoting out of context (sometimes referred to as contextomy or quote mining) is an informal fallacy in which a passage is removed from its surrounding matter in such a way as to distort its intended meaning. Contextomies may be either intentional or accidental if someone misunderstands the meaning and omits something essential to clarifying it, thinking it to be non-essential.  As a fallacy, quoting out of context differs from false attribution, in that the out of context quote is still attributed to the correct source.

Arguments based on this fallacy typically take two forms:
As a straw man argument, it involves quoting an opponent out of context in order to misrepresent their position (typically to make it seem more simplistic or extreme) in order to make it easier to refute. It is common in politics.
As an appeal to authority, it involves quoting an authority on the subject out of context, in order to misrepresent that authority as supporting some position.

Contextomy
Contextomy refers to the selective excerpting of words from their original linguistic context in a way that distorts the source's intended meaning, a practice commonly referred to as "quoting out of context".  The problem here is not the removal of a quote from its original context per se (as all quotes are), but to the quoter's decision to exclude from the excerpt certain nearby phrases or sentences (which become "context" by virtue of the exclusion) that serve to clarify the intentions behind the selected words.  Comparing this practice to surgical excision, journalist Milton Mayer coined the term "contextomy" to describe its use by Julius Streicher, editor of the infamous Nazi broadsheet Der Stürmer in Weimar-era Germany.  To arouse anti-semitic sentiments among the weekly's working class Christian readership, Streicher regularly published truncated quotations from Talmudic texts that, in their shortened form, appear to advocate greed, slavery, and ritualistic murder.  Although rarely employed to this malicious extreme, contextomy is a common method of misrepresentation in contemporary mass media, and studies have demonstrated that the effects of this misrepresentation can linger even after the audience is exposed to the original, in context, quote.

In advertising
One of the most familiar examples of contextomy is the ubiquitous "review blurb" in advertising. The lure of media exposure associated with being "blurbed" by a major studio may encourage some critics to write positive reviews of mediocre movies.  However, even when a review is negative overall, studios have few reservations about excerpting it in a way that misrepresents the critic's opinion.

For example, the ad copy for New Line Cinema's 1995 thriller Se7en attributed to Owen Gleiberman, a critic for Entertainment Weekly, used the comment "a small masterpiece." Gleiberman actually gave Se7en a B− overall and only praised the opening credits so grandiosely: "The credit sequence, with its jumpy frames and near-subliminal flashes of psychoparaphernalia, is a small masterpiece of dementia." Similarly, United Artists contextomized critic Kenneth Turan's review of their flop Hoodlum, including just one word from it—"irresistible"—in the film's ad copy: "Even Laurence Fishburne's incendiary performance can't ignite Hoodlum, a would-be gangster epic that generates less heat than a nickel cigar. Fishburne's 'Bumpy' is fierce, magnetic, irresistible even… But even this actor can only do so much." As a result of these abuses, some critics now deliberately avoid colorful language in their reviews. In 2010, the pop culture magazine Vanity Fair reported that it had been the victim of "reckless blurbing" after the television show Lost had taken a review fragment of "the most confusing, asinine, ridiculous—yet somehow addictively awesome—television show of all time" and only quoted "the most addictively awesome television show of all time" in its promotional material. Carl Bialik recorded an instance of an adverb being applied to a different verb in a 2007 advert for Live Free or Die Hard, where a New York Daily News quote of "hysterically overproduced and surprisingly entertaining" was reduced to "hysterically... entertaining".

In the United States, there is no specific law against misleading movie blurbs, beyond existing regulation over false advertising. The MPAA reviews advertisements for tone and content rather than the accuracy of their citations. Some studios seek approval from the original critic before running a condensed quotation. The European Union's Unfair Commercial Practices Directive prohibits contextomy, and targets companies who "falsely claim accreditation" for their products in ways that are "not being true to the terms of the [original] endorsement". It is enforced in the United Kingdom by the Office of Fair Trading, and carries a maximum penalty of a £5,000 fine or two years imprisonment.

Creation–evolution controversy
Scientists and their supporters used the term quote mining as early as the mid-1990s in newsgroup posts to describe quoting practices of certain creationists.<ref>The Revised Quote Book, E.T. Babinski (ed), TalkOrigins Archive</ref> The term is used by members of the scientific community to describe a method employed by creationists to support their arguments,"The Counter-creationism Handbook", Mark Isaak,  p. 14 though it can be and often is used outside of the creation–evolution controversy. Complaints about the practice predate known use of the term: Theodosius Dobzhansky wrote in his famous 1973 essay "Nothing in Biology Makes Sense Except in the Light of Evolution": 

This has been compared to the Christian theological method of prooftexting:

The Institute for Creation Research (ICR) described the use of "[a]n evolutionist's quote mistakenly used out of context" to "negate the entirety of [an] article and creationist claims regarding the lack of transitional forms" as "a smoke screen".

Both Answers in Genesis (AiG) and Henry M. Morris (founder of ICR) have been accused of producing books of mined quotes. TalkOrigins Archive (TOA) states that "entire books of these quotes have been published" and lists prominent creationist Henry M. Morris's That Their Words May Be Used Against Them and The Revised Quote Book as examples, in addition to a number of online creationist lists of quote-mines. Both AiG and ICR use the following quote from Stephen Jay Gould on intermediate forms.

Context shows that Gould rejected the gradualists' explanation for the lack of support for gradual change in favor of his own interpretation.  He continues:

Knowing that creationists are quoting him as if he were saying there were no transitional forms, Gould responded:

"Absurd in the highest degree"
Since the mid-1990s, scientists and their supporters have used the term quote mining to describe versions of this practice as used by certain creationists in the creation–evolution controversy. An example found in debates over evolution is an out-of-context quotation of Charles Darwin in his Origin of Species:

This sentence, sometimes truncated to the phrase "absurd in the highest degree", is often presented as part of an assertion that Darwin himself believed that natural selection could not fully account for the complexity of life. However, Darwin went on to explain that the apparent absurdity of the evolution of an eye is no bar to its occurrence, and elaborates on its evolution:

Other out of context quotations
Besides the creation–evolution controversy, the fallacy of quoting out of context is also used in other areas. In some instances, commentators have used the term quote mining, comparing the practice of others with creationist quote mining.

 Entertainment: with The Times reporting its frequent abuse by promoters with, for example, "I couldn't help feeling that, for all the energy, razzmatazz and technical wizardry, the audience had been shortchanged" being pared down to "having 'energy, razzmatazz and technical wizardry.
 Travel: The Guardian ran an article in May 2013 with the subheading "Sri Lanka has the hotels, the food, the climate and the charm to offer the perfect holiday, says Ruaridh Nicoll. It's just a pity about the increasingly despotic government". A highly edited version of this piece was immediately posted on the official Sri Lankan news portal under the heading "Sri Lanka has everything to offer perfect holiday" [sic].
 Pseudohistory: A book review in The New York Times'' recounts Lerone Bennett Jr.'s "distortion by omission" in citing a letter from Abraham Lincoln  as evidence that he "did not openly oppose the anti-immigrant Know-Nothing Party" because, as Lincoln explained, "they are mostly my old political and personal friends", while omitting to mention that the remainder of the letter describes Lincoln's break with these former Whig Party associates  of his, and his anticipation of "painful necessity of my taking an open stand against them."
 Alternative medicine: Analysis of the evidence submitted by the British Homeopathic Association to the House of Commons Evidence Check on Homeopathy contains many examples of quote mining, where the conclusions of scientific papers were selectively quoted to make them appear to support the efficacy of homeopathic treatment. For example, one paper's conclusion was reported as "There is some evidence that homeopathic treatments are more effective than placebo" without the immediately following caveat "however, the strength of this evidence is low because of the low methodological quality of the trials. Studies of high methodological quality were more likely to be negative than the lower quality studies."

See also
Cherry picking

FactCheck.org
Half-truth
Prooftext
Recontextualization

Notes

Further reading

External links
 

Informal fallacies
Verbal fallacies
Ambiguity
Deception